Matapédia station is a Via Rail station in Matapédia, Quebec, Canada. Matapédia is the junction between two rail lines. The east-west former Intercolonial Railway mainline from Halifax to Rivière-du-Loup is joined from the east by a line running along the south coast of the Gaspé Peninsula to the town of Gaspé.

As a result, Matapédia was where two Via Rail routes diverged en route to their eastern termini, whereas they converged when heading westbound.  The 6 day/week Halifax-Montreal Ocean and 3 day/week Montreal – Gaspé train operated as one train between Matapédia and Montreal in the winter time when each separate train has fewer cars.

Since the 2004 introduction of Renaissance cars (the former Nightstar trains from the UK) on the Ocean both trains operated separately between Matapédia and Montreal during the summer when each train was longer. Service to Gaspé was interrupted in 2013 and has not resumed however there have been recent attempts to resuscitate it.

When operating separately, the Montreal – Gaspé train ran several minutes ahead of the Ocean toward Montreal.  When combined, the trains ran together as far as Matapédia before the Ocean continued to Halifax, Nova Scotia and the Montreal – Gaspé train proceeded to Gaspé.

The Canadian National Railway station is a designated Heritage Railway Station, under the Heritage Railway Stations Protection Act.

References

External links

Via Rail page for the Ocean
Via Rail page for the Montreal – Gaspé train

Via Rail stations in Quebec
Designated Heritage Railway Stations in Quebec
Railway stations in Gaspésie–Îles-de-la-Madeleine